Fernando Manuel Gomes de Sousa (born 4 August 1967) is an Angolan retired footballer who played as a midfielder.

Club career
Born in Luanda, Sousa played his entire career in Portugal. His spell as a professional consisted of 11-and-a-half seasons with S.C. Campomaiorense which he represented in all four major levels, with Primeira Liga totals of 73 games and two goals.

Sousa part of the side who reached the final of the Portuguese Cup, being an unused substitute in the 0–1 loss to S.C. Beira-Mar. He retired in 2004, at the age of 36.

International career
Sousa played 13 times for the Angola national team, scoring his only goal on 6 April 1997 against Togo, in a 1998 FIFA World Cup qualification match.

International goals

References

External links

1967 births
Living people
Footballers from Luanda
Angolan footballers
Association football midfielders
Primeira Liga players
Liga Portugal 2 players
Segunda Divisão players
F.C. Alverca players
S.C. Campomaiorense players
O Elvas C.A.D. players
Angola international footballers
1998 African Cup of Nations players
Angolan expatriate footballers
Expatriate footballers in Portugal
Angolan expatriate sportspeople in Portugal